Kamil Jan Jóźwiak (born 22 April 1998) is a Polish professional footballer who plays as a winger for Major League Soccer club Charlotte FC and the Poland national football team. He began his professional career in his home country with Lech Poznań, from whom he joined Derby County in 2020.

Club career
Jóźwiak debuted for Lech Poznań on 28 February 2016 in 0–2 loss against Jagiellonia Białystok. He was loaned to GKS Katowice in 2017

Jóźwiak signed for Derby County on 16 September 2020. He scored his first goal for the club in a 2–0 win against Swansea City on 16 December 2020.

On 11 March 2022, Jóźwiak  signed a three-year deal with Major League Soccer side Charlotte FC for an undisclosed transfer fee.

International career
Jóźwiak made his debut for Poland national football team on 19 November 2019 in a Euro 2020 qualifier against Slovenia. He substituted Sebastian Szymański in the 86th minute. Prior to making his international bow, Jóźwiak was capped by his country at every level from Under-16 through to Under-21.

He went on to start every game in the 2020–21 UEFA Nations League, recording a goal and an assist over six matches.

Jóźwiak was named in Poland's squad for the rearranged UEFA European Championships in the summer of 2021. He started all three matches as Poland exited the competition in the group stage. Nevertheless, Jóźwiak registered an assist, setting up Robert Lewandowski's second-half goal in a 1–1 draw with Spain.

Career statistics

Club

1 Includes Polish Super Cup.

International

Scores and results list Poland's goal tally first.

Honours
Lech Poznań
 Polish Super Cup: 2016

References

External links
 
 
 

1998 births
Living people
People from Międzyrzecz
Polish footballers
Poland youth international footballers
Poland under-21 international footballers
Poland international footballers
Association football midfielders
Lech Poznań II players
Lech Poznań players
GKS Katowice players
Derby County F.C. players
Charlotte FC players
III liga players
I liga players
Ekstraklasa players
English Football League players
UEFA Euro 2020 players
Polish expatriate footballers
Polish expatriate sportspeople in England
Expatriate footballers in England
Polish expatriate sportspeople in the United States
Expatriate soccer players in the United States
Designated Players (MLS)
Major League Soccer players